Perevoloki is the name of several rural localities in Russia:
Perevoloki, Bezenchuksky District, Samara Oblast, a selo in Bezenchuksky District of Samara Oblast
Perevoloki, Syzransky District, Samara Oblast, a selo in Syzransky District of Samara Oblast
Perevoloki, Tula Oblast, a village in Selivanovskaya Rural Administration of Shchyokinsky District of Tula Oblast